The Roter Graben is a river of Saxony, Germany. It rises northeast of Dresden in Dresden Heath.

See also
List of rivers of Saxony

References 

Rivers of Saxony
Rivers of Germany